Dronivka is a village (selo) in Ukraine, Bakhmut Raion, Donetsk Oblast. Its population is 613.

History 
During the Holodomor from 1932 to 1933, 37 people in the village died.

Russo-Ukrainian War 

During the Russian invasion of Ukraine, Russian soldiers attempted to cross the Siversky Donets several times. In particular, in May 2022, they brought pontoons across the river near Dronivka ( and ) and Bilohorivka. On 12 May 2022, the crossing was thwarted, and Russian forces suffered severe losses.

Demographics 
In the 1989 USSR census, the population of the village was given as 708 people, of whom 310 were men and 398 were women.

In the 2001 Ukrainian Census, the population was given as 613 people.

Languages 
In 2001, the population distribution by language was:

References 

Villages in Bakhmut Raion
Commons category link is on Wikidata